Arafa Ammar Nakuaa  (born 23 January 1982) is a Libyan footballer who plays as a midfielder for Al-Ittihad.

Nakuaa plays for the Libya national football team and made two substitute appearances at the 2009 African Championship of Nations

References

1982 births
Living people
Libyan footballers
Libya international footballers
Association football midfielders